Loggos is a village in the municipal unit of Aigialeia in the northeastern part of Achaea in the Peloponnese, Greece. The villages Loggos and Selianitika (adjacent to the southeast) share a beautiful beach on the Gulf of Corinth which is approximately 1.5 km long. Both villages are among the most popular summer destinations of Achaea. Loggos is 2 km east of Kamares, 4 km northwest of Rododafni and 7 km northwest of Aigio. The Greek National Road 8A (Athens - Corinth - Patras) runs southwest of the village.

Historical population

Sports
The "Loggos Football Field" is located in the southwestern side of Longos village near Foinikas River. Loggos historical football team, "Aris Loggou", used to be the pride of the natives due to the participation in the First Local Division. Aris Loggou produced skilled football players such as Giannis Baltimas - former Panachaiki goalkeeper who participated in the Greek Super League. Loggos sport activities include also 5x5 football fields and a basketball court.

References

External links
Cultural Society Longos "Lord Byron"
Longos (in German)
(Municipality of Sympoliteia official site) (in Greek)
 http://iason.minenv.gr/GMAP2.asp?DHMOS=ΣΥΜΠΟΛΙΤΕΙΑΣ&NOMOS=ΑΧΑΙΑΣ (in Greek) [2]

Sources
Christos Koryllos Chorography of Greece, Athens, 1903

See also
List of settlements in Achaea

Populated places in Achaea
Aigialeia